Hemsworth is a surname. Notable people with the surname include:

Chris Hemsworth (born 1983), Australian actor, brother of Liam and Luke
Gerard Hemsworth (1945-2021), British academic and contemporary artist
Liam Hemsworth (born 1990), Australian actor, brother of Chris and Luke
Luke Hemsworth (born 1981), Australian actor, brother of Chris and Liam
Ryan Hemsworth (born 1990), Canadian music producer and DJ
Wade Hemsworth (1916–2002), Canadian folk singer and songwriter